Juan Manuel Sosa (born 11 February 1985) is an Argentine professional footballer who plays as a midfielder for Sportivo Italiano.

Career
Sosa's career started in 2002 with Huracán. He appeared in two fixtures during the 2002–03 Argentine Primera División season, which concluded with relegation to Primera B Nacional; which allowed Sosa to make thirty-seven more appearances and score one goal for Huracán up until 2007. He departed midway through the year to play for Ferro Carril Oeste, before returning to the top-flight with Newell's Old Boys in 2008. His stint with them lasted just a few months, with the midfielder subsequently agreeing to join Almirante Brown of Primera B Metropolitana. His first goal for the club arrived on 15 March 2009 against Tristán Suárez.

June 2009 saw Sosa depart his homeland to play in Ecuador for Macará. Twelve appearances followed, which included his Serie A debut versus Barcelona. A return to Ferro Carril Oeste was confirmed ahead of the 2010–11 Primera B Nacional, prior to Sosa competing a move to Brazilian Campeonato Mato-Grossense side Mixto in 2011. In the same year, Sosa joined Primera B Metropolitana's Estudiantes. He remained for 2011–12 and 2012–13. Fellow third tier team Defensores de Belgrano signed Sosa on 30 June 2013. He played one hundred and seventy-six times across six seasons, which culminated with promotion.

Career statistics
.

References

External links

1985 births
Living people
Argentine footballers
Argentine expatriate footballers
People from La Matanza Partido
Sportspeople from Buenos Aires Province
Association football midfielders
Argentine Primera División players
Primera Nacional players
Primera B Metropolitana players
Ecuadorian Serie A players
Primera C Metropolitana players
Club Atlético Huracán footballers
Ferro Carril Oeste footballers
Newell's Old Boys footballers
Club Almirante Brown footballers
C.S.D. Macará footballers
Mixto Esporte Clube players
Estudiantes de Buenos Aires footballers
Defensores de Belgrano footballers
Sportivo Italiano footballers
Expatriate footballers in Ecuador
Expatriate footballers in Brazil
Argentine expatriate sportspeople in Ecuador
Argentine expatriate sportspeople in Brazil